Adiele is both a surname and a given name. Notable people with the name include:

David Adiele, Nigerian footballer
Echendu Adiele (1978–2011), Nigerian footballer
Eric Adiele, better known as Sporting Life, American musician
Adiele Afigbo (1937–2009), Nigerian historian